Three Rivers Academy Sixth Form College is a Sixth Form College located in Walton-on-Thames, in the Elmbridge district of Surrey. Three Rivers Academy Sixth Form college is part of Three Rivers Academy.

Rag Week
Three Rivers Academy Sixth Form College's annual Rag Week is a highlight of the school calendar.

Academic Success

Refurbishment
In mid-2010, the College spent £100,000 to renovate the upstairs of the Sixth Form Block.

References

External links
Official Site
Official Three Rivers Academy School Site

Sixth form colleges in Surrey
Borough of Elmbridge